The Nigerian National Order of Merit Award (NNOM) is an academic award conferred on distinguished academicians and intellectuals who have made outstanding contributions to the academic, growth and development of Nigeria.
The award is often conferred on its recipient by the Federal Government of Nigeria following a nomination and approval of the Governing Board of the Nigerian National Merit Award.
Its recipient is often decorated by the President of Nigeria. Recipients of the award have the legal right to use the postnominal title: Nigerian National Order of Merit (NNOM).
It is the highest academic award in Nigeria and since its institution in 1979, the award has so far been conferred on only 70 distinguished academicians.

List of recipients 

Chinua Achebe
Done P. Dabale
Adiele Afigbo
Alexander Animalu
David Aradeon
Seth Sunday Ajayi
J. P. Clark
Lazarus Ekwueme
Taslim Olawale Elias
Etim Moses Essien
Akpanoluo Ikpong Ikpong Ette
Francis Idachaba
Ladi Kwali
Andrew Jonathan Nok
Chukwuedu Nwokolo
Tanure Ojaide
Isidore Okpewho
Niyi Osundare
Lateef Akinola Salako
Mabel Segun
Wole Soyinka
Oye Gureje
Peter Onyekwere Ebigbo
Oyewale Tomori
 Bruce Onobrakpeya
Tolu Olukayode Odugbemi
Adesoji Adesina
Olufemi Obafemi

References

External links
 Nigerian National Merit Award official website.

Nigerian awards